Manyata Dutt (born Dilnawaz Sheikh; 22 July 1978), simply known as Manyata, is an Indian entrepreneur, former actress and the current CEO of Sanjay Dutt Productions. She married Bollywood actor Sanjay Dutt in 2008. She is best known for her item number in Prakash Jha's 2003-hit Gangaajal.

Personal life

Manyata Dutt was born in a Muslim family on 22 July 1978; in Mumbai. She was raised in Dubai. She was known as Sara Khan in the film industry. After her launch in Kamaal Rashid Khan's Deshdrohi in 2008, she was given the screen name "Manyata", by Jha, but her aspirations to become a star ended when her father died, leaving the responsibility of the family business on her.

She married Sanjay Dutt on 7 February 2008 in a private wedding in Goa. After two years she became the mother of twins, a boy named Shahraan and a girl named Iqra on 21 October 2010.

Career
Prior to her marriage and before she met Dutt, Maanayata worked in Hindi films, such as Lovers Like Us, opposite actor Nimit Vaishnav. The rights of the film were later purchased by Sanjay Dutt for Rs. 20 lakh.

An item number "alhad mast jawani" in Gangajal movie picturized on manyata dutt.

In popular culture
In the biographical film Sanju, directed by Rajkumar Hirani, which has been released on 29 June 2018, based on the life of Sanjay Dutt, her part has been portrayed by the actress Dia Mirza, while Ranbir Kapoor has portrayed the title role.

References

External links 

 
 

1978 births
Living people
21st-century Indian actresses
Actresses in Hindi cinema
Indian film actresses
Actresses from Mumbai
People named in the Paradise Papers